The following is a list of international bilateral treaties between Australia and Greece
 Early treaties were extended to Australia by the British Empire, however they are still generally in force.
 European Union treaties, extended to Greece are not included below.

References

Treaties of Australia
Treaties of Greece
Treaties